Nibris was a video game development company located in Kraków, Poland, developing primarily for the Nintendo DS and Wii video game consoles. Nibris was most known for its cancelled Wii project Sadness, a survival horror game. The company no longer exists; its official website closed in February 2010, making Double Bloob their only game developed, and was reported later in October to have been transformed into a coordinator for the European Center of Games, ceasing game development permanently. Remaining Nibris staff and projects were also reported to have been handed over to Bloober Team, another game developer.

Announced projects
 Sadness (Wii) (Cancelled)
 The Children of the Night (Nintendo DS) (Cancelled)
 Raid over the River (Wii, Nintendo DS) (Cancelled)
 Double Bloob (Wii, Nintendo's DSiWare) (Released December 1, 2010)

References 

Companies based in Kraków
Video game companies disestablished in 2010
Defunct video game companies of Poland
Video game development companies